Antimony sulfate, Sb2(SO4)3, is a hygroscopic salt formed by reacting antimony or its compounds with hot sulfuric acid.  It is used in doping of semiconductors and in the production of explosives and fireworks.

Structure
Solid antimony sulfate contains infinite ladders of  SO4 tetrahedra and SbO3 pyramids sharing corners. It is often described as a mixed oxide, Sb2O3.3SO3.

Chemical properties
Antimony sulfate is sometimes called a "salt" as it can be produced from the reaction of antimony and sulfuric acid, but antimony does not form a nitrate when dissolved in nitric acid, (an oxidising acid) but produces a mixture of antimony oxides, and this contrasts with bismuth which dissolves in both acids to form salts. It is deliquescent, and soluble in acids. It can be prepared by dissolving antimony, antimony trioxide, antimony trisulfide or antimony oxychloride in hot, concentrated sulfuric acid.
2 Sb (s) + 6 H2SO4 → Sb2(SO4)3 + 3SO2 + 6 H2O

Uses
Owing to its solubility, antimony sulfate has uses in the doping of semiconductors. It is also used for coating anodes in electrolysis and in the production of explosives and fireworks.

Safety
Antimony(III) sulfate causes irritation to the skin and mucous membranes.

Natural occurrence
Natural analogue of the exact compound is yet unknown. However, basic hydrated Sb sulfates are known as the minerals klebelsbergite and coquandite.

References

Antimony(III) compounds
Sulfates